Edward Arthur Sanders Wyllie (28 January 1848  – 6 March 1911) was a British medium and spirit photographer.

Wyllie was born in Calcutta, British India, as a British subject, and moved to England as a small boy. He moved to California in 1886 to work as a photographer. He also worked as a medium and spirit photographer. His spirit photographs were exposed as frauds. Negatives of pre-made spirit images were found in his house and it was also discovered that Wyllie had used a method of "palming small spirit drawings executed in luminous paint and pressing them to the photographic plate" which he confessed to.

He died in London in 1911.

References
    

1848 births
1911 deaths
19th-century British photographers
Artists from Kolkata
British emigrants to the United States
British fraudsters
English spiritual mediums